The Bond is a two-reel propaganda film created by Charlie Chaplin at his own expense for the Liberty Loan Committee for theatrical release to help sell U.S. Liberty Bonds during World War I.

Made in 1918 with Edna Purviance, Albert Austin and Sydney Chaplin, the film has a distinctive visual motif set in a simple plain black set with starkly lit simple props and arrangements. The story is a series of sketches humorously illustrating various bonds like the bond of friendship and of marriage and, most important, the Liberty Bond, to K.O. the Kaiser which Charlie does literally.

That theme is made explicit when Charlie meets Uncle Sam and a laborer representing industry. Charlie buys a liberty bond and the industrial laborer supplies a rifle for an American soldier. Charlie is sufficiently impressed by the result of his patriotic contribution that he reveals more funds he had hidden in his pants to buy another bond and an American Naval sailor is thus equipped with a rifle himself.

There was also a British version with Uncle Sam replaced by John Bull and promotes War Bonds.

Cast
 Albert Austin as Friend
 Henry Bergman as John Bull (British version)
 Charles Chaplin as Charlie
 Sydney Chaplin as The Kaiser 
 Joan Marsh as Cupid
 Edna Purviance as Charlie's Wife/Liberty
 Tom Wilson as Industry

References

External links

 
 

1918 films
American black-and-white films
Short films directed by Charlie Chaplin
American World War I propaganda films
American silent short films
Cultural depictions of Wilhelm II
Articles containing video clips
First National Pictures films
1910s American films
Silent war films